David Bird may refer to:
David Bird (bridge) (born 1946), British bridge writer
David Bird (journalist) (1959–2014), American financial journalist
David John Bird (born 1946), dean of Trinity Episcopal Cathedral, San Jose

See also
Dave Bird (born 1984), English footballer